Nassarius thaumasius is a species of sea snail, a marine gastropod mollusk in the family Nassariidae, the nassa mud snails or dog whelks.

Description

Distribution
This species occurs in the Red Sea.

References

External links
 

Nassariidae
Gastropods described in 1900